Joëlle Sabourin (born May 28, 1972) is a Canadian curler from Gatineau.

Born in Hull, Quebec, Canada, Sabourin is a five-time provincial champion for her native Quebec, earning her the right to play at five national championships (the Scotties Tournament of Hearts).

In 2001 Sabourin won the Canadian Mixed Curling Championship playing lead for Jean-Michel Ménard.

From 2004 to 2007, Sabourin played in Ontario for Jenn Hanna. In 2004 and 2006 she was the team's third. In 2005, when she was pregnant, Sabourin was the team's alternate. It was that season that the team lost in the 2005 Scott Tournament of Hearts finals to Jennifer Jones. In 2007, Sabourin played lead and second for the team before leaving it to play for Larouche. In 2010 season Sabourin joined Chantal Osborne and now plays third stones.  Sabourin will play five major events on the curling tour, at the beginning of 2011,  with Jennifer Jones, as a replacement for Jill Officer who will be on maternity leave from September to December. Although Sabourin was initially planning to take the year off, she will also play several tour events with her Quebec team.

Teams

Women's

Mixed

References

External links
 
 Joelle Sabourin – Curling Canada Stats Archive

1972 births
Canadian women curlers
Curlers from Quebec
Canadian mixed curling champions
French Quebecers
Living people
Sportspeople from Gatineau
Canada Cup (curling) participants